Morawaka is a small town in the Matara District, Southern Province of Sri Lanka, a centre of Ceylon tea plantations and rice paddies. Additionally, Morawaka is said to have gem resources.

Education
 Morawaka Keerthi Abeywickrama National School
 Morawaka Kanishta Vidyalaya
 Rambukana prathamika Vidyalaya
 Alapaladeniya Primary School

See also
List of towns in Southern Province, Sri Lanka

External links

Populated places in Southern Province, Sri Lanka